The Year-on-Year Inflation-Indexed Swap (YYIIS) is a standard derivative product over Inflation rate. The underlying is a single Consumer price index (CPI).

It is called Swap because each year there is a swap of a fixed amount against a floating amount. But in reality only a one way payment is made (fixed amount - floating amount).

Detailed flows 
 Each year, at time 
 Party B pays Party A the fixed amount 
 Party A pays Party B the floating amount 
where:
 K is the contract fixed rate
 N the contract nominal value
 M the number of years corresponding to the deal maturity
 i the number of years (0 < i <= M)
  is the fixed-leg year fractions for the interval [Ti−1, Ti]
  is the floating-leg year fractions for the interval [Ti−1, Ti]
  is the start date
  is the time of the flow i
  is the maturity date (end of the swap)
  is the inflation at start date (time )
  is the inflation at time of the flow i (time )
  is the inflation at maturity date (time )

See also 
 Zero-Coupon Inflation-Indexed Swap (ZCIIS)

Inflation
Derivatives (finance)
Swaps (finance)